Emil Bekker Ousager (born 19 July 1987) is a Danish former professional football player in the goalkeeper position.

Ousager retired in the summer 2015 at the age of 27.

References

External links
 National team profile
 Official Danish League stats

1987 births
Living people
Danish men's footballers
Footballers from Odense
Odense Boldklub players
Randers FC players
Næsby Boldklub players
Aarhus Gymnastikforening players
Danish Superliga players
Association football midfielders